Jane Gilbert (born Susan Jane Kies, August 31, 1919 – September 21, 2004) was an American actress.

Early years
Gilbert was born in Dubuque, Iowa, the daughter of Mr. and Mrs. John Kies, who had five other daughters and one son. She was the sister of actress Margaret Lindsay. As a student at Dubuque High School, she participated in sports, graduating in 1937. Gilbert also studied in dramatic schools.

Career
She acted in the Boothbay Stock Company in Boothbay, Maine, using the name Gilbert because people were unsure how to pronounce Kies. A 20th Century Fox scout offered her a film contract while she was appearing in Death Takes a Holiday, but she rejected it, citing a desire to gain more experience on stage. Soon afterward, she performed in What a Life in New York.

While in Maine, Gilbert did a screen test for Warner Bros. Pictures but heard no results. Eventually, she went to Hollywood, where Margaret Lindsay introduced Gilbert as her sister, Jane Lindsay. Studio officials finally realized that Jane Lindsay was the same actress as Jane Gilbert, whose screen test they found to be good. In August 1939, Gilbert signed a long-term contract with Warner Bros. As she became a member of that company, Lindsay was leaving it, possibly to avoid competing for roles with her sister, but perhaps also because she had complained about her recent treatment by the Warner Bros.

On radio, Gilbert portrayed Kathleen Carney in Bachelor's Children.

Personal life
Gilbert was married to actor William Hopper, and in 1947 they had one daughter, Joan. Jane Gilbert passed away 24 Sep 2004.

References

External links 

 

1919 births
2004 deaths
20th-century American actresses
American film actresses
American radio actresses
American stage actresses
Actresses from Iowa
21st-century American women